Haan is a town in the district of Mettmann, in North Rhine-Westphalia, Germany. It is situated at the western edge of the Bergisches Land, 12 km southwest of Wuppertal and 17 km east of Düsseldorf. In 1975, Gruiten was incorporated into Haan.

History

Haan's origins date back to around 2200 BC. Dated BC. At that time, a hail-shaped settlement was founded in today's city center, which is equipped with a rampart, palisade fence and hedging strips. Accordingly, the name "Haan" should be derived from Hagen, with a reorganization analogous to grove.

From 718 AD Haan was close to the Saxon-Franconian border running between Sonnborn and Elberfeld (both today in Wuppertal). Since today's Kaiserstrasse was a route for the Franconian troops to the east, a marketing system (sutlers) was created in Haan to supply the soldiers.

Even before the early High Middle Ages, Haan belonged to the Archdiocese of Cologne together with Hilden and, even after the formation of the county and later the Duchy of Berg, was initially one of the enclaves within this territorial area. Already around 850 a pre-Romanesque chapel or church was built on the old church square, which Archbishop Wichfried von Köln consecrated in 935. At that time this church was subordinate to the main church in Hilden.

In 1386 the road from Hilden via Haan to Elberfeld, today's federal road 228, was first mentioned in a document. The first evidence of the grinding and weaving trade, which was widespread in Haan until the 20th century, can be dated back to 1589 and 1724 respectively.

In the second half of the 16th century the church of Haan was reformed by the Evangelicals.

Until 1806, Haan, Obgruiten and Gruiten belonged to the Amt Solingen, Ellscheid to the Amt Mettmann within the Duchy of Berg. In 1808, the towns of Haan, Ellscheid, Millrath (today Erkrath), Gruiten, Schöller and Sonnborn (both today Wuppertal) came under French rule and were united to form "Mairie Haan". In 1815 this Mairie was placed under Prussian administration and rededicated to a Prussian mayor's office. [6] At that time, the Mayor's Office (no real office, in German: Bürgermeisterei) of Haan included the following seven special household parishes: Parish Haan, Honschaft Ellscheid, Honschaft Millrath, Honschaft Gruiten, Honschaft Schöller, Honschaft Obgruiten and Kirchspiel Sonnborn.

In 1841, with the completion of the Elberfeld — Gruiten — Düsseldorf railway line, Haan was connected to the ever-expanding rail network. Another connection followed in 1867 with the Ohligs-Gruiten line.

In the same year Sonnborn retired from the Haan mayor's office (Bürgermeisterei). In 1894 Haan left the mayor's office and Millrath, Gruiten and Schöller henceforth formed the mayor's office, later Amt Gruiten.

In 1899 Haan got connection to the tram connection from Benrath (today to Düsseldorf) via Hilden to Vohwinkel (today to Wuppertal). City rights were granted to Haan in 1921.

At the turn of 1944/1945, World War II left visible traces in the cityscape when residential areas in Upper and Middle Haan were bombed on New Year's and New Year's Day. 70 people were killed. On April 16, 1945, US-American troops entered Haan, which were replaced by British forces in July 1945.

In 1956, the Catholic parish replaced its neo-Gothic church from 1869 with the modern St. Chrysanthus and Daria church.

Since July 14, 2017, Haan has had the addition of the name "Garden City" to the state of North Rhine-Westphalia in accordance with section 13 (3) of the municipal code. The city had previously described itself as a “garden city”. In the 19th century, deep garden areas were assigned to the residential buildings; Seed trading played an important role in the urban economy.

Population development
(each on December 31)

1996: 28,996 inhabitants
1997: 29,213 inhabitants
1998: 29,452 inhabitants
1999: 29,525 inhabitants
2000: 29,677 inhabitants
2001: 29,607 inhabitants
2002: 29,518 inhabitants
2003: 29,472 inhabitants
2004: 29,370 inhabitants
2005: 29,325 inhabitants
2006: 29,411 inhabitants
2007: 29,323 inhabitants
2008: 29,149 inhabitants
2009: 30,074 inhabitants
2010: 29,149 inhabitants
2011: 30,257 inhabitants
2012: 29,848 inhabitants
2013: 29,985 inhabitants
2014: 30,811 inhabitants
2015: 31,137 inhabitants
2016: 31,230 inhabitants
2017: 31,265 inhabitants

Twin towns – sister cities

Haan is twinned with:
 Eu, France (1967)
 Berwick-upon-Tweed, England, United Kingdom (1982)
 Bad Lauchstädt, Germany (1990)
 Dobrodzień, Poland (2004)

Economy

Companies
Emerson Electric Company
Discher Technik GmbH
Anlagenbau Stampfer
Ostermann Furnitures
Rockwell Automation
Bohle Group
Unipol Haan
Daimler Truck AG

Notable people
 Günter Breithardt (born 1944), cardiologist, pioneer of catheter ablations, professor at University of Münster
 Jonas Carls (born 1997), footballer from FC Schalke 04
 Rahul Peter Das (born 1954), Indologist, professor for South Asian studies at University of Halle-Wittenberg
 Melanie Hoffmann (born 1974), former footballer for SGS Essen
 Walter Huppenkothen (1907–1978),  lawyer, high-ranking Nazi official, SS member, SD staff
 Anna Kraft (born 1985), sport journalist and former athlete at TSV Bayer 04 Leverkusen
 Nicole Struse (born 1971), former table tennis player who won several national contests

References

External links
Official website 

Towns in North Rhine-Westphalia
Mettmann (district)